Terence Bonaventure MacKin (1 May 1915 – 18 October 2008) was an Australian rules footballer who played with Fitzroy in the Victorian Football League (VFL).

Notes

External links 

1915 births
2008 deaths
Australian rules footballers from Victoria (Australia)
Fitzroy Football Club players